Cass High School is a four-year public high school located in Cartersville, Georgia, United States, one of five high schools in Bartow County. It serves grades 9-12. The current principal is Stephen Revard.

Athletics

Cass High School offers a variety of sports, including football, men's basketball, women's basketball, baseball, men's soccer, women's soccer, volleyball, softball, swimming, cross country, wrestling, track, tennis, and golf.

Football
The Cass Colonels football team went to the state playoffs in 2004 for the first time in 21 years, and the second time in school history. They also made it to the playoffs in 2006.

Wrestling
2006 – GHSAA Class AAA Dual Wrestling Champions
2008 – GHSAA Class AAA Traditional Wrestling Champions
2022 – GHSA 5A Dual State Champions

Men’s soccer 

In 2008 the Cass High School soccer team were ranked 5th in state.

Notable alumni

 Eddie Lee Wilkins - former professional basketball player

References

Schools in Bartow County, Georgia
Public high schools in Georgia (U.S. state)